The Juno Awards of 1983, representing Canadian music industry achievements of the previous year, were awarded on 5 April 1983 in Toronto at a ceremony hosted by Burton Cummings and Alan Thicke at the Harbour Castle Hilton in the Metropolitan Ballroom.

Western Canadian artists have proven to be a major force in the music industry in the 1980s with 1983 Juno winners such as Bryan Adams, Loverboy and the Payola$.

Awards ceremony
The Juno ceremonies were broadcast as a two-hour special on CBC Television from 7pm Eastern Time. Interest in the telecast was growing substantially, with 3.2 million viewers in 1982, and 4.4 million for this year's edition.

During their opening co-hosts Cummings and Thicke introduced the Compact Disc to the viewing audience, likely the first introduction to the new media for many people.  Columbia Records had just released their first ever batch of titles on CD about one month before the broadcast.  As Cummings recalled: "Alan held up Toto IV, and it was also the first time I held one in my hand.  I don't think Alan had seen one before that night... It felt like 'show and tell' and it was pretty cool for that to happen on national TV."

Payola$ were the top band this year with three awards including "Most Promising Group" and "Best Selling Single" for "Eyes of a Stranger".  Bob Rock was absent (ironically he was mixing Loverboy's next album) and so band-mate Paul Hyde accepted their awards.  For the "Most Promising Group" award he remarked "Somebody told us that to get this award is the kiss-off.  Nobody's going to kiss us off."

Loverboy continued their winning streak by taking both the "Group of the Year" and "Album of the Year" awards for the second year in a row, this time for their sophomore effort Get Lucky.  Other repeat winners for the same awards from the 1982 Juno's included Liona Boyd, Anne Murray and The Good Brothers.

Bryan Adams won his first ever Juno award but was unable to accept it in person as he was touring in the U.S., so his manager Bruce Allen accepted it on his behalf.

The "Canadian Music Hall of Fame" award was posthumously given to Glenn Gould who had died the previous year.  Gould's award was presented by then Governor General Edward Schreyer and accepted by Gould's former manager John Roberts. Gould was also nominated twice in the same category for "Best Classical Album" and won this award for his 1981 re-recording of Bach: The Goldberg Variations.

Nominees and winners
Similar to the 1981 Juno's, the category for "Best Comedy Album" was not awarded this year.

Female Vocalist of the Year
Winner: Carole Pope

Other nominees:
 Jessie Burns
 Joni Mitchell
 Anne Murray
 Shari Ulrich

Male Vocalist of the Year
Winner: Bryan Adams

Other nominees:
 Burton Cummings
 Gordon Lightfoot
 Murray McLauchlan
 Aldo Nova

Most Promising Female Vocalist of the Year
Winner: Lydia Taylor

Other nominees:
 Lee Aaron
 Terry Crawford
 Luba
 Mary Lu Zahalan

Most Promising Male Vocalist of the Year
Winner: Kim Mitchell

Other nominees:
 Lawrence Gowan
 David Roberts
 Leroy Sibbles
 David Wilcox

Group of the Year
Winner: Loverboy

Other nominees:
 April Wine
 Chilliwack
 Rush
 Saga

Most Promising Group of the Year
Winner: Payola$

Other nominees:
 Doug and the Slugs
 Headpins
 The Spoons
 Strange Advance

Composer of the Year
Winner: Bob Rock and Paul Hyde, "Eyes of a Stranger" by the Payolas

Other nominees:
 Robert Buckley and David Sinclair, "Letting Go" by Straight Lines
 Paul Dean and Mike Reno, "Working for the Weekend" by Loverboy
 Geoff Iwamoto and Michael Roth, "Your Daddy Don't Know" by Toronto
 Neil Peart, "New World Man" by Rush

Country Female Vocalist of the Year
Winner: Anne Murray

Other nominees:
 Carroll Baker
 Marie Bottrell
 Cathy Chambers
 Laura Vinson

Country Male Vocalist of the Year
Winner: Eddie Eastman

Other nominees:
 Harold MacIntyre
 Lee Marlow
 Paul Weber
 Diamond Joe White

Country Group or Duo of the Year
Winner: The Good Brothers

Other nominees:
 Family Brown
 Garry Lee and Showdown
 Midnite Rodeo Band
 The Rovers

Instrumental Artist of the Year
Winner: Liona Boyd

Other nominees:
 All-Star Swing Band
 The Emeralds
 Frank Mills
 The Spitfire Band

Producer of the Year
Winner: Bill Henderson and Brian MacLeod, "Whatcha Gonna Do" and "Secret Information" by Chilliwack

Other nominees:
 Terry Brown, "Subdivisions" & "Chemistry" by Rush
 Bruce Fairbairn, "Worlds Away" & "She Controls Me" by Strange Advance
 Claire Lawrence, "You're Makin Me Nervous" & "The One and Only" by Shari Ulrich
 Peter Mann, "That Kind of Man" & "Prince of Darkness" by The Nylons

Recording Engineer of the Year
Winner: Bob Rock, No Stranger to Danger by the Payola$

Other nominees:
 Gary Gray, Shaking the Foundations by Rough Trade
 Lindsay Kidd / Bob Rock, Worlds Away by Strange Advance
 Dave Slagter, Opus X by Chilliwack
 Paul Northfield, Power Play by April Wine

Canadian Music Hall of Fame
Winner: Glenn Gould (posthumous)

Nominated and winning albums

Album of the Year
Winner: Get Lucky, Loverboy

Other nominees:
 Aldo Nova, Aldo Nova
 Christmas Wishes, Anne Murray
 Signals, Rush
 Turn it Loud, Headpins

Best Album Graphics
Winner: Dean Motter, Metal on Metal by Anvil

Other nominees:
 Tom Powell, Streetheart by Streetheart
 Hugh Syme, One False Move by Harlequin
 Hugh Syme, Signals by Rush
 Scott Thornley, Rise and Shine by Raffi

Best Children's Album
Winner: When You Dream a Dream, Bob Schneider

Other nominees:
 Jim and Rosalie... At the Music Factory, Jim and Rosalie
 Junior Jug Band, Chris Whiteley and Ken Whiteley
 Valdy's Kids' Record, Valdy
 Wake Up Mr Dressup!, Ernie Coombs

Best Classical Album of the Year
Winner: Bach: The Goldberg Variations, Glenn Gould (1981 re-recording)

Other nominees:
 Haydn: The Six Last Sonatas - Glenn Gould
 Ravel: Bolero, La Valse, Rapsodie Espagnole, Alborada Del Gracioso - Orchestre Symphonique de Montreal Conducted by Charles Dutoit
 Stravinsky: The Firebird 1910 Version - Toronto Symphony Orchestra Conducted by Kazuyoshi Akiyama
 Strauss: Till Eulenspiegel, Salome's Dance, Death and Transfiguration - Vancouver Symphony Orchestra Conducted by Kazuyoshi Akiyama

International Album of the Year
Winner: Business As Usual, Men at Work

Other nominees:
 4, Foreigner
 Freeze Frame, The J. Geils Band
 Hooked on Classics, Louis Clark & Royal Philharmonic Orchestra
 Physical, Olivia Newton-John

Best Jazz Album
Winner: I Didn't Know About You, Fraser MacPherson and Oliver Gannon

Other nominees:
 Bells - Don Thompson and Rob Piltch
 Blues Tales in Time - Paul Cram
 Sometime in Another Life - Peter Leitch and George McFetridge
 Time Warp - Time Warp

Nominated and winning releases

Best Selling Single
Winner: "Eyes of a Stranger", Payolas

Other nominees:
 "Letting Go", Straight Lines
 "New World Man", Rush
 "Working for the Weekend", Loverboy
 "Your Daddy Don't Know", Toronto

International Single of the Year
Winner: "Eye of the Tiger", Survivor

Other nominees:
 "Abracadabra", Steve Miller Band
 "Da Da Da", Trio
 "I Love Rock 'n' Roll", Joan Jett and the Blackhearts
 "Physical", Olivia Newton-John

References

Bibliography
 Krewen, Nick. (2010). Music from far and wide: Celebrating 40 years of the Juno Awards. Key Porter Books Limited, Toronto.

External links
Juno Awards site

1983
1983 music awards
1983 in Canadian music